The 1974 Arkansas Razorbacks football team represented the University of Arkansas in the Southwest Conference (SWC) during the 1974 NCAA Division I football season. In their 17th year under head coach Frank Broyles, the Razorbacks compiled a 6–4–1 record (3–3–1 against SWC opponents), finished in a tie for fourth place in the SWC, and outscored their opponents by a combined total of 285 to 164.

Schedule

Roster
QB Mike Kirkland, Jr.

References

Arkansas
Arkansas Razorbacks football seasons
Arkansas Razorbacks football